Kleppa is a surname. Notable people with the surname include:

Herman Kleppa (born 1996), Norwegian footballer 
Magnhild Meltveit Kleppa (born 1948), Norwegian politician
Ole J. Kleppa (1920–2007), Norwegian-born physical chemist

Norwegian-language surnames